Ermyntrude is a feminine given name. Notable people with the surname include:

 Ermyntrude Harvey (1895–1973), British female tennis player
 Edna Ermyntrude Bourne, first woman elected to the Barbadian Parliament

See also
 Ermentrude

Feminine given names